Western Province Suburbs cricket team was a Sri Lankan First-class cricket team. The team was established in 1991 and featured only in the Inter-Provincial First Class Tournament.

Players

Notable players

 Roy Dias

Honours

Domestic

First Class
Inter-Provincial First Class Tournament: 0

References

External links
 Western Province Suburbs, CricketArchive

Former senior cricket clubs of Sri Lanka